Black-Body Theory and the Quantum Discontinuity, 1894–1912 (1978; second edition 1987) is a book by the philosopher Thomas Kuhn, in which the author surveys the development of quantum mechanics. The second edition has a new afterword.

Summary 

Kuhn surveys the development of quantum mechanics by Max Planck at the end of the 19th century. He argues that Planck misread his own earlier work.

Reception 
Alexander Bird describes Kuhn's book as "masterly", writing that it "differs from traditional history of science less in the kind of explanation offered and more in the vast erudition and scholarly attention to detail displayed."

According to philosopher Tim Maudlin, Planck and the Black Body Discontinuity (sic) "is a mixed bag: some good historiography and some poor analysis."

References 

1978 non-fiction books
American non-fiction books
Books by Thomas Kuhn
English-language books
Oxford University Press books
Philosophy of science books
Physics books